Jeff Borris (born March 29, 1962) is a sports agent and attorney who has represented hundreds of Major League Baseball players over the past 30 years.  He is considered one of the top baseball salary arbitration experts in the world and has reportedly delivered some of the most lucrative player contracts in baseball history.  Clients claim Borris has a way of getting deals done and his 24/7 work ethic is renowned throughout the industry. With over $1 billion worth of contracts negotiated, including breaking the salary barrier multiple times, he is easily one of the most influential managers in baseball history.

Professional career
Borris began his career as a sports agent as an intern at Beverly Hills Sports Council while at Southwestern Law School, which later became a full-time position. His fresh approach to baseball management soon meant that the intern became the owner along with two partners, Dan Horwits and childhood friend Rick Thurman.

Some of Borris' notable clients include Barry Bonds, Jose Canseco, Rickey Henderson, Bret Saberhagen, Bobby Bonilla, Brady Anderson, Curt Schilling, Trevor Hoffman, Michael Young, Tim Lincecum, Hunter Pence, Darren O'Day, Rick Van den Hurk, Mark Reynolds, Michael Schwimer, and Dan Uggla.

Borris also represented Dinesh Patel and Rinku Singh after the two Indian-born pitchers won an Indian reality television show called Million Dollar Arm Challenge and tried out in front of 30 major league scouts in November 2008.  The two pitchers were later signed by the Pittsburgh Pirates and became the first Indian-born players to sign a professional sports contract of any kind in America.

In 2015, Borris joined Ballengee Group.

Education

Borris earned his bachelor's degree in political science from California State University, Northridge and a Juris Doctor from Southwestern Law School. Borris was an adjunct professor of sports law at Southwestern Law School from 1993 to 2001.

Personal

Borris was born in Los Angeles and raised in the San Fernando Valley.

Borris is also an accomplished poker player and appeared in High Stakes Hold’ Em Season 2 playing against professional players like Kenny Tran and Brian Rast.

References 

1962 births
Living people
American sports agents